Italy competed at the 1981 European Athletics Indoor Championships in Grenoble, France, from 21 to 22 February 1981.

Medalists

Top eight
Eight Italian athletes reached the top eight in this edition of the championships.
Men

Women

See also
 Italy national athletics team

References

External links
 EAA official site 

1981
1981 European Athletics Indoor Championships
1981 in Italian sport